The Columbus Foxes were a minor league baseball team that played in Columbus, Georgia. USA.

History
The team originally played in the South Atlantic League from 1909 to 1917, then reformed in the Southeastern League from 1926 to 1932.

It resurfaced as a St. Louis Cardinals' affiliate known first as the Columbus Red Birds and then the Columbus Cardinals from 1936 to 1955 in the South Atlantic League. As the Red Birds, it won two league championships, first in 1936 under manager Eddie Dyer, and second in 1940 under manager Clay Hopper.

The team name returned to the Foxes after the Cardinals left in 1956 and became affiliated with the Baltimore Orioles in 1956, the Cardinals again in 1957, and the Los Angeles Dodgers in 1958. The team played in the Alabama–Florida League in 1958.

As a Pittsburgh Pirates' affiliate in 1959, they were known as the Columbus Pirates. It moved to Gastonia, North Carolina, on July 6, 1959, and became the Gastonia Pirates.

The ballpark
Beginning in 1926, the Foxes played at Golden Park, located at 100 4th Street Columbus, Georgia 31901. Golden Park is still in use today and was renovated and used in the 1996 Olympic Games for softball.

Notable alumni

Baseball Hall of Fame alumni
 Walter Alston (1939) inducted, 1983
 Bob Gibson (1957) inducted, 1981
 Enos Slaughter (1936) inducted, 1985

Notable alumni
 Luis Arroyo (1954) 2 x MLB All-Star
 Jackie Brandt (1954) 2 x MLB All-Star
 Hub Collins (1885) 1890 NL Hits Leader; Died Age 28
 Eddie Dyer (1936, MGR) Manager: 1946 World Series Champion St. Louis Cardinals
 Lenny Green (1956)
 Jim Hearn (1942) MLB All-Star; 1950 NL ERA Title
 Ray Jablonski (1950) MLB All-Star
 Oscar Judd (1936) MLB All-Star
 Eddie Kazak (1946) MLB All-Star
 George Kissell (1954)
 Clyde Kluttz (1940)
 Denny Lyons (1885) 
 Skeeter Newsome (1956)
 Rip Repulski (1949-1950) MLB All-Star
 Dick Sisler (1941) MLB All-Star
 Dave Wickersham (1959)

References

External links
Baseball Reference

Baltimore Orioles minor league affiliates
Defunct minor league baseball teams
South Atlantic League (1904–1963) teams
St. Louis Cardinals minor league affiliates
Pittsburgh Pirates minor league affiliates
Los Angeles Dodgers minor league affiliates
Sports in Columbus, Georgia
Baseball teams established in 1909
Sports clubs disestablished in 1959
1909 establishments in Georgia (U.S. state)
1959 disestablishments in Georgia (U.S. state)
Defunct baseball teams in Georgia
Defunct South Atlantic League teams
Baseball teams disestablished in 1959